Ruth B. Phillips (born 1945) is a Canadian art historian and curator who specializes in North American aboriginal art. She is an author of numerous books and articles on the subjects of Indigenous studies, anthropology/archaeology, political science, international studies, public policy, Canadian studies, and cultural studies.

Career
Phillips received her doctorate in African art history in 1979 from the University of London at the School of Oriental and African Studies. Her dissertation was about masquerade performance by Mende women in Sierra Leone. She became a professor at Carleton University in 1979. Ruth Phillips became a Director of University of British Columbia Museum of Anthropology in Vancouver in 1997, where she, with three First Nations partner communities, and museum staff created a successful expansion and renewal plan for a $41 million grant to the Canada Foundation for Innovation, the British Columbia Knowledge Foundation, and the University of British Columbia.

In 2005, Phillips, Heidi Bohaker, First Nations partners, and many other scholars co-founded the Great Lakes Research Alliance for the Study of Aboriginal Arts & Cultures (GRASAC). Phillips organized many grants, and supervised the team of GRASAC research assistants in her time as the director. Phillips holds the Canada Research Chair in Modern Culture at Carleton University.

Publications
Berlo, Janet C., and Phillips, Ruth B. (1998) Native North American Art. Oxford: Oxford University Press, . 1998, and later reprints
Representing Woman: Sande Society Masks of the Mende of Sierra Leone, Los Angeles: Fowler Museum of Cultural History, U.C.L.A., 1995
Trading Identities: The Souvenir in Native North American Art from the Northeast, 1700_1900, Seattle: University of Washington Press and Montreal: McGill-Queen's, 1998.4
Unpacking Culture: Arts and Commodities in Colonial and Postcolonial Worlds, with Christopher B. Steiner, Berkeley: University of California Press, 1999
Sensible Objects: Colonialism, Museums and Material Culture, co-edited with Elizabeth Edwards and Chris Gosden, 2006
Museum Pieces: Toward the Indigenization of Canadian Museums, 2011
Museum Transformations, co-edited with Annie E. Coombes, International Handbooks of Museums, 2015

References 

Living people
Canadian art historians
Canadian art curators
Academic staff of Carleton University
Canadian women historians
Canadian women curators
1945 births
Place of birth missing (living people)